John Quinn (August 9, 1839 – February 23, 1903) was an American businessman and politician who served one term as a U.S. Representative from New York from 1889 to 1891.

Life
Quinn was born in County Tipperary, Ireland, immigrated to the United States in 1866, and settled in Manhattan, New York City. He engaged in the real estate and building business. He was president of the West Side Electric Light & Power Company and was one of the founders and a director of the Homestead Bank of New York.

Political career 
Quinn was a member of the New York State Assembly (New York Co., 17th D.) in 1883; and was a member of the board of aldermen in 1885–1887. He was a delegate to the Democratic National Convention in 1884 and 1888.

Congress 
Quinn was elected as a Democrat to the Fifty-first Congress (March 4, 1889 – March 3, 1891).

Death 
Quinn died in New York City on February 23, 1903, at the age of 63, he is interred in Calvary Cemetery, Woodside, New York.

References

External links

 

1839 births
1903 deaths
Burials at Calvary Cemetery (Queens)
Irish emigrants to the United States (before 1923)
Democratic Party members of the New York State Assembly
Politicians from Manhattan
Politicians from County Tipperary
Democratic Party members of the United States House of Representatives from New York (state)
19th-century American politicians